was a JR East railway station located in Kesennuma, Miyagi Prefecture, Japan. Services to the station have been suspended since the 2011 Tōhoku earthquake and tsunami and have now been replaced by a provisional bus rapid transit line.

Lines
Fudōnosawa Station was served by the Kesennuma Line, and is located 69.6 rail kilometers from the terminus of the line at Maeyachi Station.

Station layout
Fudōnosawa Station had one side platform serving a single bi-directional track. The station was unattended.

History
Fudōnosawa Station opened on 10 October 1960. The station was absorbed into the JR East network upon the privatization of the Japan National Railways (JNR) on April 1, 1987. Services to the station have been suspended since the 2011 Tōhoku earthquake and tsunami and have now been replaced by a provisional bus rapid transit line, and the former platform and station building modified into a bus station.

Surrounding area
Kesennuma General Hospital
Japan National Route 45

External links

  
  video of a train trip from Kesennuma Station to Minami-Kesennuma Station in 2009, passing through Fudōnosawa Station at around 03:25 minutes without stopping.  Satellite photos (e.g., in Google Maps) showed that sections of track near Minami-Kesennuma Station were severely affected by the 2011 tsunami.  Kesennuma Station and Fudōnosawa Station were undamaged.

Railway stations in Miyagi Prefecture
Kesennuma Line
Railway stations in Japan opened in 1960
Railway stations closed in 2011
Kesennuma